Buyut Aram is a village in Dhofar Governorate,  in southwestern Oman.

References

Populated places in the Dhofar Governorate